The Aberdeen Typhoon Shelters of Hong Kong are Aberdeen West Typhoon Shelter and Aberdeen South Typhoon Shelter. Both typhoon shelters are located in Southern District, between the southern part of Hong Kong Island and the island Ap Lei Chau. They are roughly separated by the Ap Lei Chau Bridge and Aberdeen Channel Bridge. The Aberdeen floating village is located within the shelters.

History
The breakwaters for both typhoon shelters were completed in the 1960s.

Aberdeen West Typhoon Shelter
Aberdeen West Typhoon Shelter is located between Aberdeen, which is on Hong Kong Island, and Ap Lei Chau. It includes Shek Pai Wan, also known as Aberdeen Bay.

Aberdeen South Typhoon Shelter
Aberdeen South Typhoon Shelter is located between Wong Chuk Hang, on Hong Kong Island and Ap Lei Chau. It occupies a major portion of Aberdeen Channel. The bays of Sham Wan, which hosts the Aberdeen Marina, and Po Chong Wan are within the shelter. The Jumbo Kingdom floating restaurant was located within this shelter until 2022.

See also
 List of typhoon shelters in Hong Kong

References

External links

 Plan of Passage Area in Aberdeen West Typhoon Shelter
 Plan of Passage Area in Aberdeen South Typhoon Shelter

Typhoon shelters in Hong Kong
Aberdeen, Hong Kong
Ap Lei Chau